Blister is a Rock band from Portugal.  They were in first position for two weeks on a national Portuguese radio station, RDP Antena 3.

EP's
2002   Not For Sale

LP's
2004 Without truth you are the loser
2007 Bigger than Us

Portuguese musical groups